Kydon Palace is a Greek Ro-Pax high speed ferry, built in 2001 at the Sestri Ponente shipyards by Fincantieri as the Festos Palace and owned by Minoan Lines. She is a sister ship of  MS Knossos Palace (2000)  . She was named by Kydon  the mythical founder of the ancient Kydonia, an ancient city of Crete in present-day Chania. She can reach speeds up to 30 knots. The ship's facilities include restaurants, bars and cabins.

Characteristics 

The vessel is a night ferry designed for services between Piraeus and Heraklion, Crete, but she can also be used for daytime trips. She is powered by four, 150L Wärtsilä 16V46C diesel engines. Both her and her sistership are very similar to JANAS class, built by their shipyard for Tirrenia during the same time.

In total, the ship has eight decks. The Deck 5 is called "Androgeo" and features the reception. The Deck 6 is called "Atlantis", where it has an à la carte restaurant called "Yakinthos", with a capacity of 241 people, as well as a self-service restaurant called "Dionysos", with a capacity of 300 people. The difference between the two restaurants is that in one the passengers serve themselves, while in the other they order their meal. On the same deck there is a lounge called "Niovi", an Internet café, outdoor decks and a shop called "Erofili". In the bow there is a large lounge, the "King Radamanthys". There is also the VIP Lounge - Lux Cabins, with a capacity of 98 people. The Deck 7 is called "Zakros" and has cabins as well as airline-type seats. The Deck 8 is called "Zephyros" and has VIP airline-type seats, swimming pools, a sun deck and a pool bar, which are open during the summer months. There is also the round deck "Asterion" and the disco "Selini". On the same deck there is also the bridge (cockpit) of the ship.

Transfer on the Piraeus-Chania line and renaming 
In 2020, she was transferred from the Piraeus-Heraklion line to Piraeus-Chania and gained her current name. She was inaugurated on February 22, 2020, by the Deputy Regional Governor of Chania, N. Kalogeris. A second inauguration ceremony took place on July 25 of the same year, in the presence of the Greek Minister of Shipping and Island Policy, Giannis Plakiotakis and the president of the Grimaldi Group, Emanuel Grimaldi.

References

External links 

 HSF Kydon Palace at minoan.gr
 Info at Fincantieri.com

Ferries of Greece
Ships built in Genoa
2001 ships
Ships built by Fincantieri